Larbi Zéroual (born 14 January 1971) is a Moroccan long-distance runner. He competed in the men's 10,000 metres at the 1996 Summer Olympics.

References

1971 births
Living people
Athletes (track and field) at the 1996 Summer Olympics
Moroccan male long-distance runners
Olympic athletes of Morocco
Place of birth missing (living people)